Aproaerema isoscelixantha is a moth of the family Gelechiidae. It was described by Oswald Bertram Lower in 1897. It is found in Australia, where it has been recorded from New South Wales.

The wingspan is about 10 mm. The forewings are black, with a yellow triangular spot on costa at five-sixths reaching nearly one-third across the wing. The hindwings are greyish-fuscous.

References

Moths described in 1897
Aproaerema
Moths of Australia